The 2020 Indiana Democratic presidential primary had been scheduled to take place on May 5, 2020, but was postponed to June 2 due to the COVID-19 pandemic, alongside seven delayed and regular primaries on that day in the Democratic Party primaries for the 2020 presidential election. The Indiana primary was an open primary, with the state awarding 89 delegates to the 2020 Democratic National Convention, of whom 82 were pledged delegates allocated on the basis of the primary results.

Former vice president and presumptive nominee Joe Biden won the primary with more than 76% of the vote and all but two delegates, which went to Senator Bernie Sanders, who missed the 15% threshold for statewide delegates with 13.6%. Biden crossed the necessary majority of 1,991 delegates to officially win the Democratic nomination three days later during the vote count.

Procedure
Indiana was the only state scheduled to vote on May 5 in the Democratic primaries. Due to the COVID-19 pandemic, Governor Eric Holcomb and Secretary of State Connie Lawson agreed with the chairs of the Democratic and the Republican party to reschedule the primary for June 2, the same day as the primaries in the District of Columbia, Maryland, Montana, New Mexico, Pennsylvania, Rhode Island and South Dakota.

Voting took place throughout the state from 6 a.m. until 6 p.m. local time. Candidates had to meet a threshold of 15% at the congressional district or statewide level to be considered viable. The 82 pledged delegates to the 2020 Democratic National Convention were allocated proportionally on the basis of the primary results. Of these, between 5 and 8 were allocated to each of the state's 9 congressional districts and another 9 were allocated to party leaders and elected officials (PLEO delegates), in addition to 18 at-large delegates. Originally planned with 70 delegates, the final number included a 20% bonus of 12 additional delegates on the 46 district and 15 at-large delegates by the Democratic National Committee due to the original May date, which belonged to Stage III on the primary timetable.

The state convention to designate the district-level national convention delegates had been planned for June 13 to June 17, but was replaced by an online vote in the same period. The district delegates then voted on the 18 at-large and 9 pledged PLEO delegates for the Democratic National Convention. The delegation also included 7 unpledged PLEO delegates: 5 members of the Democratic National Committee and 2 representatives from Congress.

Candidates
The following individuals appeared on the ballot:

Running
Joe Biden
Withdrawn

Michael Bloomberg
Pete Buttigieg
Tulsi Gabbard
Amy Klobuchar
Bernie Sanders
Tom Steyer
Elizabeth Warren
Andrew Yang

Polling

Results

Notes
Additional candidates

See also
2020 Indiana Republican presidential primary

References

External links
The Green Papers delegate allocation summary
Indiana Democratic Party delegate selection plan
FiveThirtyEight Indiana primary poll tracker

Indiana Democratic
Democratic primary
2020
Indiana Democratic